Christine Slythe-Wynn (born 10 August 1961) is a Canadian former athlete. She competed in the 800 metres at the 1984 Summer Olympics and in the 400 metres hurdles at the 1988 Summer Olympics.

References

External links
 
 
 
 
 

1961 births
Living people
Athletes (track and field) at the 1984 Summer Olympics
Athletes (track and field) at the 1988 Summer Olympics
Canadian female hurdlers
Canadian female middle-distance runners
Olympic track and field athletes of Canada
Pan American Games silver medalists for Canada
Pan American Games medalists in athletics (track and field)
Athletes (track and field) at the 1983 Pan American Games
World Athletics Championships athletes for Canada
Competitors at the 1983 Summer Universiade
Place of birth missing (living people)
Medalists at the 1983 Pan American Games